Philip Torchio (August 2, 1868 in Vercana, Como, Italy – January 14, 1942 in Bronxville, New York) was an Italian electrical engineer known for his work at the Edison Electric Company and his many inventions in the transmission and distribution of electric energy. He received the IEEE Edison Medal for "distinguished contributions to the art of central station engineering and for achievement in the production, distribution and utilization of electrical energy".

Torchio was the mayor of Bronxville, New York from 1929 to 1931. In 1938, having reached the 70-year age limit, he retired as Vice President of Consolidated Edison.

References

External links
 Biography

1868 births
1942 deaths
American people of Italian descent
American electrical engineers
Italian electrical engineers
IEEE Edison Medal recipients